The Performing Garage is an Off-Off-Broadway theater in SoHo, New York City. Established in 1968, it is the permanent home of the experimental theater company originally named The Performance Group (under Richard Schechner) that morphed in 1980 into The Wooster Group (under Elizabeth LeCompte), and their primary performance venue.

Since 1978, it also hosts their annual "Visiting Artist Series" or "Emerging Artist Series". Located at 33 Wooster Street, it seats approximately 60. Actors such as Willem Dafoe debuted in earnest here and regularly come back.

History
The location was originally not a garage but a metal stamping/flatware factory, back when SoHo was an empty warehouse district being colonized by artists. It was acquired in 1968 by its first artistic and theater director, Richard Schechner.

The Performing Garage was established there in 1968 as a home for Schechner's company The Performance Group (1967–1980), starting with Dionysus in 69 (1968). Because of the group's name, the theater is sometimes erroneously called the Performance Garage.

In 1975, some members began to develop their own productions and perform them at the Performing Garage but not under the name of The Performance Group, starting with Sakonnet Point (1975).

In 1980, Richard Schechner resigned as director and the Performing Garage became home to the troupe renamed The Wooster Group under Elizabeth LeCompte, with their 1975–1980 independent works being retroactively considered productions of the new Group.

The Performing Garage is owned and operated by the Wooster Group as a shareholder in the Grand Street Artists Co-op (originally established as part of the Fluxus art movement in the 1960s).

Located at 33 Wooster Street, it is one block north of Canal Street and one block east of West Broadway in SoHo, New York.

Artist series
Since 1978, the Performing Garage has hosted an annual "Visiting Artist Series".

In 1999, they started an "Emerging Artist Series", a three-week program intended to spotlight up-and-coming multimedia performers by granting three individuals or groups a week of rehearsal time and a weekend of performances in the Performing Garage. Selected among 20 candidates, the first series featured:

 1999
 Elliott Earls, Eye Sling Shot Lions
 Radiant Pig (country mystic folk-art band)
 Radiohole, A History of Heen: Not Francis E. Dec, Esq. — about Francis E. Dec

References

Notes

Sources
 Citysearch. "The Performing Garage" (editor's review), consulted in March 2009
 Village Voice (1999). "Garage Music", The Village Voice, July 13, 1999.
 Wooster Group. "The Performing Garage", consulted in March 2009
 Wooster Group. "Production History since 1975", consulted in March 2009

External links

 The Performing Garage's page

Off-Off-Broadway
1968 establishments in New York City
Performance art in New York City
SoHo, Manhattan